The  is a 7.6-km long commuter rail line in Kyoto, Japan, operated by the Keihan Electric Railway. It connects Chushojima Station on the Keihan Main Line in Fushimi, Kyoto and Uji Station in Uji, Kyoto, forming an alternative route to JR West's Nara Line. All trains stop at all stations.

Stations and connections

Rolling stock
New 13000 series four-car electric multiple unit (EMU) trains were introduced on the line from April 2012, replacing the earlier 2600 series EMUs.

History
The line opened on June 1, 1913, electrified at 600 V DC.

The voltage on the line was raised to 1,500 V DC in December 1983.

See also
 List of railway lines in Japan

References

Uji Line
Rail transport in Kyoto Prefecture
Standard gauge railways in Japan
Railway lines opened in 1913
1913 establishments in Japan